Glasgow North is a burgh constituency of the House of Commons of the Parliament of the United Kingdom (at Westminster). It elects one Member of Parliament (MP)  by the first-past-the-post voting system.

It was first contested at the 2005 general election, and the incumbent MP is Patrick Grady who was elected for the Scottish National Party in 2015, but he was suspended from the party on 26 June 2022; pending the outcome of a police investigation for allegations of sexual harassment. On 29 December 2022 Grady had the whip restored following the ending of his six month suspension.

At the 2016 referendum on UK membership of the European Union, the constituency voted overwhelmingly in favour of "Remain" with 78.4%. This was the fourth-highest support for a Remain vote in any constituency in the United Kingdom.

Boundaries

The Glasgow wards of Firhill, Hillhead, Hyndland, Kelvindale, Maryhill, North Kelvin, Partick, Summerston, Woodlands, and Wyndford.

Glasgow North is one of seven constituencies covering the Glasgow City council area. All are entirely within the council area.

Prior to the 2005 general election, the city area was covered by ten constituencies, of which two straddled boundaries with other council areas. The North constituency includes most of the former Glasgow Maryhill constituency, central sections of the former Glasgow Kelvin constituency and a Kelvindale area from the former Glasgow Anniesland constituency. Scottish Parliament constituencies retain the names and boundaries of the older Westminster constituencies.

The Glasgow North constituency has Glasgow University within its boundaries, and stretches out through Kelvindale to the large Summerston housing development. The largest element of the seat, in terms of former constituency boundaries, comes from the Maryhill constituency, which was a mainly working class seat. The North seat also includes the more middle class areas of Hillhead, Hyndland and Kelvindale.

Members of Parliament

Election results

Elections in the 2010s

Elections in the 2000s

See also 
 Politics of Glasgow

References

♯ This reference gives all recent Glasgow City Westminster election results. You select the year and then the constituency to view the result.

Westminster Parliamentary constituencies in Scotland
Constituencies of the Parliament of the United Kingdom established in 2005
Politics of Glasgow
Partick
Maryhill
Hillhead